The Goulandris Museum of Contemporary Art is a modern art museum in Eratosthenous Street, Pangrati, Athens, Greece, opened in October 2019. It displays many of the works amassed by shipowner Basil Goulandris and his wife Elise Karadontis, who died in 1994, with an art collection valued at US$3 billion.

It is housed in a 1920s neoclassical mansion with a ten-storey new extension (five of which are below ground). The building has a total surface area of 7,250 sq.m. and the exhibition areas cover a total of five floors; four above ground with a surface area of 1,124 sq.m., where the permanent collection is housed, and one below ground, with a surface area of 530 sq.m., which hosts temporary exhibitions of Greek and foreign artists.

The building also houses a museum shop and a café-restaurant. The floors below ground hosts a library with around 4,500 books, a children's workshop, and a 190-seat amphitheatre.

Artworks

Basil Goulandris collected works by artists including Pablo Picasso, Marc Chagall, Henri Matisse, Alberto Giacometti, Auguste Renoir, Joan Miro, Paul Klee, Wassily Kandinsky, El Greco, Cézanne and Modigliani, as well as works by Greek modern painters including Parthenis, Bouzianis, Vasileiou, Hadjikyriakos-Ghika, Tsarouchis, Moralis, and Tetsis.  

Collection highlights include:
 Francis Bacon, Three Studies for Self-Portrait, 1972
 Pierre Bonnard, Getting Out of the Bath, 1926
 Georges Braque, Patience, 1942
 Paul Cézanne, Portrait of the Artist Looking Over His Shoulder, 1883-1884
 Marc Chagall, Portrait of E.B.G., 1969
 Giorgio de Chirico, Horses on the Beach, 1930
 Edgar Degas, Little Dancer Aged Fourteen, 1878
 Max Ernst, While the Earth Sleeps, 1956
 Paul Gauguin, Still Life with Grapefruits, 1901 
 Alberto Giacometti, Portrait of Yanaihara, 1960 
 Wassily Kandinsky, Both Striped, 1932
 Roy Lichtenstein, Nude with White Flower, 1994
 Roy Lichtenstein, Sunrise, 1965
 Henri Matisse, The Nightmare of the White Elephant, Jazz, 1947
 Joan Miró, The Grasshopper, 1926
 Claude Monet, Rouen Cathedral in the Morning (Pink Dominant), 1894
 Pablo Picasso, Nude Woman with Raised Arms, 1907
 Pablo Picasso, Young Man with Bouquet, 1905
 Jackson Pollock, Number 13, 1950, 1950
 Auguste Rodin, Eternal Springtime, 1884
 El Greco, The Veil of Saint Veronica, 1580
 Henri de Toulouse-Lautrec, Woman in Monsieur Forest’s Garden, 1891
 Vincent van Gogh, Olive Picking, 1989
 Vincent van Gogh, Still Life with Coffee Pot, 1988
 Vincent van Gogh, The Alyscamps, 1988

References

Art museums established in 2019
Museums in Athens
Goulandris family
Modern art museums in Greece